This is a list of governors of Nagano Prefecture:
Kaneyoshi Tachiki 1871–1873
Hironao Narasaki 1873–1881
Makoto Ono 1881–1884
Seiichi Kinashi 1884–1889
Utsumi Tadakatsu 1889–1891
Asada Tokunori 1891–1896
Chikaaki Takasaki 1896–1897
Kan'ichi Gondo 1897–1898
Isamu Sonoyama 1898–1899 
Norikichi Oshikawa 1899–1902 
Kiyohide Seki 1902–1905 
Tsunamasa Ōyama 1905–1911 
Teikan Chiba 1911–1913 
Ichiro Yoda 1913–1914
Yūichirō Chikaraishi 1914–1915 
Tenta Akaboshi 1915–1921 
Tadahiko Okada 1921–1922 
Toshio Honma 1922–1924 
Mitsusada Umetani 1924–1926 
Morio Takahashi 1926–1927 
Ryo Chiba 1927–1929 
Shintarō Suzuki 1929–1931 
Kuraji Ishigaki 1931–1933 
Shōzō Okada 1933–1935 
Seiichi Ōmura 1935–1936
Shunsuke Kondo 1936–1938
Seiichi Ōmura January 11–December 23, 1938 
Kenji Tomita 1938–1940 
Minoru Suzuki 1940–1942 
Hakuji Nagayasu 1942–1943 
Yoshio Kōriyama 1943–1944 
Yasuo Ōtsubo 1944–1945 
Kunrō Mononobe 1945–1947 
Yoshio Iyoku March–April 1947 
Torao Hayashi 1947–1959 
Gon'ichirō Nishizawa 1959–1980 
Goro Yoshimura 1980–2000 
Yasuo Tanaka 2000–2006
Jin Murai 2006–2010
Shuichi Abe 2010–

 
Nagano Prefecture